Guardamar del Segura or briefly Guardamar is a municipality of the province of Alicante located at the mouth of the river Segura in southern Valencia (autonomous community), Spain. It is a Mediterranean resort, with a large pine forest abutting an 11-km-long white sand beach.

Historically an area of fishermen and farmers, Guardamar del Segura is the southernmost point where Valencian is spoken. A Phoenician colony, called Herna by Roman geographer Avienius in his book Ora Maritima was the first settlement near the mouth of Segura river,  In Spanish, "guardar" means "safekeeping" and "mar" means "sea", and this is another possible basis for its current name.

Guardamar is the southernmost Catalan-speaking town and in 1991 41.8% of the town's residents could speak it. Guardamar hosts local festivals like Moros i Cristians, L'Encantà, and Fogueres de Sant Joan, which commemorate its history.

Population
The INE (Spanish Census) of 2006 showed that the city had 14,261 residents. By January 2011 this figure had reached 16,863 of which 10,051 were Spanish. The total dropped by 2015 to 15,589. The most prominent nationalities in 2015 were:

Government

Carmen Verdú is the mayor of the city. In the latest municipal elections of May 2011, Carmen Verdú of the People's Party (Partido Popular) won the elections with an absolute majority, larger than the one the former major (María Elena Albentosa) had, while the opposition (Socialist Party) lost some of their popular support. She is the second woman ever to occupy this position.

At the 2015 local elections, the political composition on the local council was:

Geography

Climate

Points of interests
 Torreta de Guardamar, a radio mast. The tallest military structure in the European Union.

References

External links
 Agrupación Musical de Guardamar del Segura
 guardamardelsegura.com
 Guardamar del Segura Quiz at LetsQuiz

Municipalities in the Province of Alicante
Seaside resorts in Spain